The St. Peter's Church also called the Pilgrimage Church of St. Peter in Capernaum is a modern Catholic pilgrimage church found in the archaeological site of Capernaum, northern Israel. The church is part of the Franciscan monastery in Capernaum. It is dedicated to St. Peter, which Catholics consider the first leader of the Church.

Archaeological excavations carried out in this place discovered another layer of residential structures, on which the first half of a first century church was built. It is considered "the first church in the world" and believed it could be the place where the house of the Apostle Peter was. In the 5th century an octagonal church was built in its place. In 1990 a church of modern pilgrimage was built over the remains of the ancient temples.

The Pilgrimage Church of St. Peter is located in the central part of the archaeological site of Capernaum, at an altitude of 195 meters on the west coast north of the Sea of Galilee, in the depression of the Jordan Valley, in northern Israel.

Built in 1989 by T R Freeman Ltd, team including Martin Grant, Mick Galloni, Mick Parkes, Doug Claxton and Graham Grant.

See also

Roman Catholicism in Israel
St. Peter's Church (disambiguation)

References

Roman Catholic churches in Israel
Buildings and structures in Capernaum